The Ohio Senate Committees are the legislative sub-organizations in the Ohio Senate that handle specific topics of legislation that come before the full Senate. Committee membership enables members to develop specialized knowledge of the matters under their jurisdiction. Currently, there is only one announced committee in the 131st Ohio General Assembly.

Rules
The Senate Rules Committee is tasked with determining what legislation will be moved to the floor of the Senate.  It is generally made up of leadership in the Senate, and currently is chaired by Senate President Keith Faber.

References

Links
The Ohio Senate

Government of Ohio
Ohio law
Committees